3,4-Dimethylmethcathinone (3,4-DMMC) is a stimulant drug first reported in 2010 as a designer drug analogue of mephedrone, apparently produced in response to the banning of mephedrone, following its widespread abuse in many countries in Europe and around the world. 3,4-DMMC has been seized as a designer drug in Australia. In vitro, 3,4-DMMC was shown to be a monoamine transporter substrate that potently inhibits norepinephrine and serotonin reuptake, and to a lesser extent dopamine reuptake.

Legal Status

As of October 2015 3,4-DMMC is a controlled substance in China.

3,4-DMMC is banned in the Czech Republic.

In the United States 3,4-DMMC is considered a schedule 1 controlled substance as a positional isomer of 4-Methylethcathinone (4-MEC)

See also 
 Serotonin–norepinephrine–dopamine reuptake inhibitor
 Serotonin–norepinephrine reuptake inhibitor
 Substituted cathinone
 Indanylaminopropane
 Methylone
 Xylopropamine

References 

Cathinones
Designer drugs
Serotonin-norepinephrine-dopamine releasing agents